The Fédération internationale de football association (FIFA; ; French for International Association Football Federation) is the international governing body of association football, beach soccer, and futsal. It was founded in 1904 to oversee international competition among the national associations of Belgium, Denmark, France, Germany, the Netherlands, Spain, Sweden and Switzerland. Headquartered in Zürich, Switzerland, its membership now comprises 211 national associations. These national associations must each also be members of one of the six regional confederations into which the world is divided: CAF (Africa), AFC (Asia and Australia), UEFA (Europe), CONCACAF (North & Central America and the Caribbean), OFC (Oceania) and CONMEBOL (South America).

FIFA outlines a number of objectives in the organizational Statutes, including growing association football internationally, providing efforts to ensure it is accessible to everyone, and advocating for integrity and fair play. It is responsible for the organization and promotion of association football's major international tournaments, notably the World Cup which commenced in 1930 and the Women's World Cup which commenced in 1991. Although FIFA does not solely set the laws of the game, that being the responsibility of the International Football Association Board of which FIFA is a member, it applies and enforces the rules across all FIFA competitions. All FIFA tournaments generate revenue from sponsorship; in 2018, FIFA had revenues of over US $4.6 billion, ending the 2015–2018 cycle with a net positive of US$1.2 billion, and had cash reserves of over US$2.7 billion.

Reports by investigative journalists have linked FIFA leadership with corruption, bribery, and vote-rigging related to the election of FIFA president Sepp Blatter and the organization's decision to award the 2018 and 2022 World Cups to Russia and Qatar, respectively. These allegations led to the indictments of nine high-ranking FIFA officials and five corporate executives by the U.S. Department of Justice on charges including racketeering, wire fraud, and money laundering. On 27 May 2015, several of these officials were arrested by Swiss authorities, who were launching a simultaneous but separate criminal investigation into how the organization awarded the 2018 and 2022 World Cups. Those among these officials who were also indicted in the U.S. are expected to be extradited to face charges there as well.

Many officials were suspended by FIFA's ethics committee including Sepp Blatter and Michel Platini. In early 2017, reports became public about FIFA president Gianni Infantino attempting to prevent the re-elections of both chairmen of the ethics committee, Cornel Borbély and Hans-Joachim Eckert, during the FIFA congress in May 2017. On 9 May 2017, following Infantino's proposal, FIFA Council decided not to renew the mandates of Borbély and Eckert. Together with the chairmen, 11 of 13 committee members were removed. FIFA has been suspected of corruption regarding the Qatar FIFA World Cup.

History

The need for a single body to oversee association football became increasingly apparent at the beginning of the 20th century with the increasing popularity of international fixtures. The Fédération Internationale de Football Association (FIFA) was founded in the rear of the headquarters of the Union des Sociétés Françaises de Sports Athlétiques (USFSA) at the Rue Saint Honoré 229 in Paris on 21 May 1904. The French name and acronym are used even outside French-speaking countries. The founding members were the national associations of Belgium, Denmark, France, the Netherlands, Spain (represented by then-Madrid Football Club; the Royal Spanish Football Federation was not created until 1913), Sweden and Switzerland. Also, that same day, the German Football Association (DFB) declared its intention to affiliate through a telegram.

The first president of FIFA was Robert Guérin. Guérin was replaced in 1906 by Daniel Burley Woolfall from England, by then a member of the association. The first tournament FIFA staged, the association football competition for the 1908 Olympics in London was more successful than its Olympic predecessors, despite the presence of professional footballers, contrary to the founding principles of FIFA.

Membership of FIFA expanded beyond Europe with the application of South Africa in 1909, Argentina in 1912, Canada and Chile in 1913, and the United States in 1914.

The 1912 Spalding Athletic Library "Official Guide" includes information on the 1912 Olympics (scores and stories), AAFA, and FIFA. The 1912 FIFA President was Dan B Woolfall. Daniel Burley Woolfall was president from 1906 to 1918.

During World War I, with many players sent off to war and the possibility of travel for international fixtures severely limited, the organization's survival was in doubt. Post-war, following the death of Woolfall, the organization was run by Dutchman Carl Hirschmann. It was saved from extinction but at the cost of the withdrawal of the Home Nations (of the United Kingdom), who cited an unwillingness to participate in international competitions with their World War enemies. The Home Nations later resumed their membership.

The FIFA collection is held by the National Football Museum at Urbis in Manchester, England. The first World Cup was held in 1930 in Montevideo, Uruguay.

Identity

Flag 

The FIFA flag has a blue background, with the organization's wordmark logo in the middle. The current FIFA flag was first flown during the 2018 FIFA World Cup opening ceremony in Moscow, Russia, and has been used ever since.

Anthem 

Akin to the UEFA Champions League, FIFA has adopted an anthem composed by the German composer Franz Lambert since the 1994 FIFA World Cup. It has been re-arranged and produced by Rob May and Simon Hill. The FIFA Anthem is played at the beginning of official FIFA sanctioned matches and tournaments such as international friendlies, the FIFA World Cup, FIFA Women's World Cup, FIFA U-20 World Cup, FIFA U-17 World Cup, Football at the Summer Olympics, FIFA U-20 Women's World Cup, FIFA Women's U-17 World Cup, FIFA Futsal World Cup, FIFA Beach Soccer World Cup and FIFA Club World Cup.

Since 2007, FIFA has also required most of its broadcast partners to use short sequences including the anthem at the beginning and end of FIFA event coverage, as well as for break bumpers, to help promote FIFA's sponsors. This emulates practices long used by some other international football events such as the UEFA Champions League. Exceptions may be made for specific events; for example, an original piece of African music was used for bumpers during the 2010 FIFA World Cup.

Presidents

Structure

Six confederations and 211 national associations

Besides its worldwide institutions, there are six confederations recognized by FIFA which oversee the game in the different continents and regions of the world. National associations, and not the continental confederations, are members of FIFA. The continental confederations are provided for in FIFA's statutes, and membership of a confederation is a prerequisite to FIFA membership.

Asian Football Confederation (AFC; 47 members)
Confederation of African Football (CAF; 56 members)
Confederation of North, Central American and Caribbean Association Football (CONCACAF; 41 members)
Confederación Sudamericana de Fútbol (CONMEBOL; 10 members)
Oceania Football Confederation (OFC; 13 members)
Union of European Football Associations (UEFA; 55 members)

In total, FIFA recognizes 211 national associations and their associated men's national teams as well as 129 women's national teams; see the list of national football teams and their respective country codes. The number of FIFA member associations is higher than the number of UN member states as FIFA has admitted associations from 23 non-sovereign entities as members in their own right, such as the four Home Nations within the United Kingdom and the two special administrative regions of China: Hong Kong and Macau.

On 28 February 2022 FIFA suspended Russia from all competitions because of their violent and forceful invasion of Ukraine. FIFA suspends countries quite often because of governance interference, corruption, or financial irregularities. It can also be because of doping or other drugs.

The FIFA Men's World Rankings are updated monthly and rank each team based on their performance in international competitions, qualifiers, and friendly matches. There is also a world ranking for women's football, updated four times a year.

Laws and governance
 
FIFA's headquarters are in Zürich, and it is an association established under the law of Switzerland.

FIFA's supreme body is the FIFA Congress, an assembly made up of representatives from each affiliated member association. Each national football association has one vote, regardless of its size or footballing strength. The Congress assembles in ordinary sessions once every year, and extraordinary sessions have been held once a year since 1998. Congress makes decisions relating to FIFA's governing statutes and their method of implementation and application. Only Congress can pass changes to FIFA's statutes. The congress approves the annual report, and decides on the acceptance of new national associations, and holds elections. Congress elects the President of FIFA, its general secretary, and the other members of the FIFA Council in the year following the FIFA World Cup.

FIFA Council – formerly called the FIFA Executive Committee and chaired by the president – is the main decision-making body of the organization in the intervals of congress. The council is composed of 37 people: the president; 8 vice presidents; and 28 members from the confederations, with at least one of them being a woman. The executive committee is the body that decides which country will host the World Cup.

The president and the general secretary are the main office holders of FIFA, and are in charge of its daily administration, carried out by the general secretariat, with its staff of approximately 280 members. Gianni Infantino is the current president, elected on 26 February 2016 at an extraordinary FIFA Congress session after former president Sepp Blatter was suspended pending a corruption investigation.

FIFA's worldwide organizational structure also consists of several other bodies, under the authority of the FIFA Council or created by Congress as standing committees. Among those bodies are the FIFA Emergency Committee, the FIFA Ethics Committee, the Finance Committee, the Disciplinary Committee, and the Referees Committee.

The FIFA Emergency Committee deals with all matters requiring immediate settlement in the time frame between the regular meetings of the FIFA Council. The Emergency Committee consists of the FIFA president as well as one member from each confederation. Emergency Committee decisions made are immediately put into legal effect, although they need to be ratified at the next Executive Committee meeting.

Administrative cost
FIFA publishes its results according to International Financial Reporting Standards. The total compensation for the management committee in 2011 was 30 million for 35 people. Blatter, the only full-time person on the committee, earned approximately two million Swiss francs, 1.2 million in salary and the rest in bonuses. A report in London's The Sunday Times in June 2014 said the members of the committee had their salaries doubled from $100,000 to $200,000 during the year. The report also said leaked documents had indicated $4.4 million in secret bonuses had been paid to the committee members following the 2010 FIFA World Cup in South Africa.

Governance

The laws that govern football, known officially as the Laws of the Game, are not solely the responsibility of FIFA; they are maintained by a body called the International Football Association Board (IFAB). FIFA has members on its board (four representatives); the other four are provided by the football associations of the United Kingdom: England, Scotland, Wales, and Northern Ireland, who jointly established IFAB in 1882 and are recognized for the creation and history of the game. Changes to the Laws of the Game must be agreed upon by at least six of the eight delegates.

The FIFA Statutes form the overarching document guiding FIFA's governing system. The governing system is divided into separate bodies that have the appropriate powers to create a system of checks and balances. It consists of four general bodies: the congress, the executive committee, the general secretariat, and standing and ad hoc committees.

Discipline of national associations
FIFA frequently takes active roles in the running of the sport and developing the game around the world. One of its sanctions is to suspend teams and associated members from international competition when a government interferes in the running of FIFA's associate member organizations or if the associate is not functioning properly.

A 2007 FIFA ruling that a player can be registered with a maximum of three clubs, and appear in official matches for a maximum of two, in a year measured from 1 July to 30 June has led to controversy, especially in those countries whose seasons cross that date barrier, as in the case of two former Ireland internationals. As a direct result of this controversy, FIFA modified this ruling the following year to accommodate transfers between leagues with out-of-phase seasons.

Video replay and goal-line technology

FIFA now permits the use of video evidence during matches, as well as for subsequent sanctions. However, for most of FIFA's history it stood opposed to its use. The 1970 meeting of the International Football Association Board "agreed to request the television authorities to refrain from any slow-motion play-back which reflected, or might reflect, adversely on any decision of the referee". As recently as 2008 FIFA president Sepp Blatter said: "Let it be as it is and let's leave [football] with errors. The television companies will have the right to say [the referee] was right or wrong, but still the referee makes the decision – a man, not a machine." This stance was finally overturned on 3 March 2018, when the IFAB wrote video assistant referees (also known as VARs) into the Laws of the Game on a permanent basis. Their use remains optional for competitions.

In early July 2012 FIFA sanctioned the use of goal-line technology, subject to rules specified by the International Football Association Board (IFAB), who had officially approved its use by amending the Laws of the Game to permit (but not require) its use. This followed a high-profile incident during a second-round game in the 2010 FIFA World Cup between England and Germany, where a shot by Englishman Frank Lampard, which would have levelled the scores at 2–2 in a match that ultimately ended in a 4–1 German victory, crossed the line but was not seen to do so by the match officials, which led FIFA officials to declare that they would re-examine the use of goal-line technology.

Controversy 

On 28 February 2022, due to the 2022 Russian invasion of Ukraine and in accordance with a recommendation by the International Olympic Committee (IOC), FIFA suspended the participation of Russia.  The Russian Football Union unsuccessfully appealed the FIFA ban to the Court of Arbitration for Sport, which upheld the ban. Some observers, while approving of the boycott of Russia, have pointed out that FIFA did not boycott Saddam Hussein's Iraq as an aggressor during the Iran–Iraq War, Saudi Arabia for its military intervention in Yemen, Qatar for its human rights violations, or the United States for the actions of the U.S. military during the Iraq War.

FIFA previously banned Indonesia due to government intervention within the team. FIFA requires members play “with no influence from third parties.”

Recognition and awards
FIFA holds an annual awards ceremony, The Best FIFA Football Awards since 2016, which recognizes both individual and team achievements in international association football. Individually, the top men's player is awarded The Best FIFA Men's Player and the top women's player is The Best FIFA Women's Player. Other main awards are The Best FIFA Football Coach and FIFA FIFPro World11.

In 2000, FIFA presented two awards, FIFA Club of the Century and FIFA Player of the Century, to decide the greatest football club and player of the 20th century. Real Madrid was the club winner, while Diego Maradona and Pelé were the joint player's winners.

FIFA competitions

National teams
Men's
FIFA World Cup
Men's Olympic Football Tournament (U-23)
FIFA U-20 World Cup
FIFA U-17 World Cup
FIFA World Series
FIFA Futsal World Cup
Men's Youth Olympic Futsal Tournament (U-20)
FIFA Beach Soccer World Cup
FIFA Arab Cup (senior teams of the UAFA (Arab world))
Women's
FIFA Women's World Cup
Women's Olympic Football Tournament
FIFA U-20 Women's World Cup
FIFA U-17 Women's World Cup
FIFA Women's Futsal World Cup
Women's Youth Olympic Futsal Tournament (U-20)

Clubs
Men's
FIFA Club World Cup
Future annual FIFA club competition
FIFA Youth Cup
Women's
FIFA Women's Club World Cup
FIFA Youth Cup

eSports
Individual
 FIFAe World Cup
Team
 FIFAe Club World Cup (FIFAe Club Series)
 FIFAe Nations Cup (FIFAe Nations Series)

Former tournaments
FIFA Confederations Cup

Current title holders

Esports

FIFA World Rankings

Men's
The following table has the Top 20 ranked men's football countries in the world.

Women's
The following table has the Top 20 ranked women's football countries in the world.

Sponsors of FIFA

 FIFA Partner
 Adidas
 Coca-Cola
 Hyundai/Kia Motors
 Qatar Airways
 QatarEnergy
 Visa
 Wanda Group

FIFA+

In April 2022 FIFA launched FIFA+, an OTT service providing up to 40,000 live matches per year, including 11,000 women's matches. It was also confirmed that FIFA would make available archival content, including every FIFA World Cup and FIFA Women's World Cup match recorded on camera, together with original documentary content. Eleven Sports was later reported to be responsible for populating the FIFA+ platform with live matches.

Corruption

In May 2006, British investigative reporter Andrew Jennings' book Foul! The Secret World of FIFA: Bribes, Vote-Rigging, and Ticket Scandals (HarperCollins) caused controversy within the football world by detailing an alleged international cash-for-contracts scandal following the collapse of FIFA's marketing partner International Sport and Leisure (ISL), and revealed how some football officials have been urged to secretly repay the sweeteners they received. The book also alleged that vote-rigging had occurred in the fight for Sepp Blatter's continued control of FIFA as the organization's president. Shortly after the release of Foul! a BBC Panorama exposé by Jennings and BBC producer Roger Corke, screened on 11 June 2006, reported that Blatter was being investigated by Swiss police over his role in a secret deal to repay more than £1m worth of bribes pocketed by football officials. Lord Triesman, the former chairman of the English Football Association, described FIFA as an organization that "behaves like a mafia family", highlighting the organization's "decades-long traditions of bribes, bungs and corruption".

All testimonies offered in the Panorama exposé were provided through a disguised voice, appearance, or both, save one: Mel Brennan, a former CONCACAF official, became the first high-level football insider to go public with substantial allegations of corruption, nonfeasance, and malfeasance by CONCACAF and FIFA leadership. Brennan—the highest-level African-American in the history of world football governance—joined Jennings, Trinidadian journalist Lisana Liburd and many others in exposing allegedly inappropriate allocations of money by CONCACAF, and drew connections between ostensible CONCACAF criminality and similar behaviors at FIFA. Since then, and in the light of fresh allegations of corruption by FIFA in late 2010, both Jennings and Brennan remain highly critical of FIFA. Brennan has called directly for an alternative to FIFA to be considered by the stakeholders of the sport throughout the world.

In a further Panorama exposé broadcast on 29 November 2010, Jennings alleged that three senior FIFA officials, Nicolas Leoz, Issa Hayatou and Ricardo Teixeira, had been paid huge bribes by ISL between 1989 and 1999, which FIFA had failed to investigate. Jennings claimed they appeared on a list of 175 bribes paid by ISL, totaling about $100  million. A former ISL executive said that there were suspicions within the company that they were only awarded the marketing contract for successive World Cups by paying bribes to FIFA officials. The program also alleged that another current official, Jack Warner, has been repeatedly involved in reselling World Cup tickets to touts; Blatter said that FIFA had not investigated the allegation because it had not been told about it via 'official channels.'

Panorama also alleged that FIFA requires nations bidding to host the World Cup to agree to implement special laws, including a blanket tax exemption for FIFA and its corporate sponsors, and limitation of workers rights. Contrary to FIFA's demands, these conditions were revealed by the Dutch government, resulting in them being told by FIFA that their bid could be adversely affected. Following Jennings' earlier investigations, he was banned from all FIFA press conferences, for reasons he claimed had not been made clear. The accused officials failed to answer questions about his latest allegations, either verbally or by letter.

Prime Minister David Cameron and Andy Anson, head of England's World Cup bid, criticized the timing of the broadcast, three days before FIFA's decision on the host for the 2018 FIFA World Cup, on the grounds that it might damage England's bid; the voters included officials accused by the program.

In June 2011, it came to light that the International Olympic Committee had started inquiry proceedings against FIFA honorary president João Havelange into claims of bribery. Panorama alleged that Havelange accepted a $1 million 'bung' in 1997 from ISL. The IOC stated that it "takes all allegations of corruption very seriously and we would always ask for any evidence of wrongdoing involving any IOC members to be passed to our ethics commission".

In a 2014 interview, American sportswriter Dave Zirin said that corruption is endemic to FIFA leadership and that the organization should be abolished for the good of the game. He said that currently, FIFA is in charge of both monitoring corruption in association football matches, and marketing and selling the sport, but that two "separate" organizational bodies are needed: an organizational body that monitors corruption and match-fixing and the like, and an organization that's responsible for marketing and sponsorships and selling the sport. Zirin said the idea of having a single organization that's responsible for both seems highly ineffective and detrimental to the sport.

In May 2015, 14 people were arrested, including nine FIFA officials, after being accused of corruption.

In the 2022 World Cup bid, Qatar was awarded the honor of hosting the World Cup.  Since then it has been discovered that Qatar paid as much as $200 billion dollars to host the World Cup. This information was discovered by the Tass news agency in Russia.

Guilty pleas
Between 2013 and 2015 four individuals, and two sports television rights corporations pleaded guilty to United States financial misconduct charges. The pleas of Chuck Blazer, José Hawilla, Daryan Warner, Darrell Warner, Traffic Group and Traffic Sports USA were unsealed in May 2015. In another 2015 case, Singapore also imposed a 6-year "harshest sentence ever received for match-fixing" on match-fixer Eric Ding who had bribed three Lebanese FIFA football officials with prostitutes as an inducement to fix future matches that they would officiate, as well as perverting the course of justice.

Indictments and arrests
Fourteen FIFA officials and marketing executives were indicted by the United States Department of Justice in May 2015. The officials were arrested in Switzerland and are in the process of extradition to the US. Specific charges (brought under the RICO act) include wire fraud, racketeering, and money laundering.

"Swiss authorities say they have also opened a separate criminal investigation into FIFA's operations pertaining to the 2018 and 2022 World Cup bids".

FIFA's top officials were arrested at a hotel in Switzerland on suspicion of receiving bribes totaling $100m (£65m). The US Department of Justice stated that nine FIFA officials and four executives of sports management companies were arrested and accused of over $150m in bribes. The UK Shadow Home Secretary and Labour Member of Parliament, Andy Burnham, stated in May 2015 that England should boycott the 2018 World Cup against corruption in FIFA and military aggression by Russia.

2018 and 2022 World Cup bids

FIFA's choice to award the 2018 World Cup to Russia and the 2022 World Cup to Qatar has been widely criticized by media. It has been alleged that some FIFA inside sources insist that the Russian kickbacks of cash and gifts given to FIFA executive members were enough to secure the Russian 2018 bid weeks before the result was announced. Sepp Blatter was widely criticized in the media for giving a warning about the "evils of the media" in a speech to FIFA executive committee members shortly before they voted on the hosting of the 2018 World Cup, a reference to The Sunday Times exposés, and the Panorama investigation.

Two members of FIFA's executive committee were banned from all football-related activity in November 2010 for allegedly offering to sell their votes to undercover newspaper reporters. In early May 2011, a British parliamentary inquiry into why England failed to secure the 2018 finals was told by a member of parliament, Damian Collins, that there was evidence from The Sunday Times newspaper that Issa Hayatou of Cameroon and Jacques Anouma of Ivory Coast were paid by Qatar. Qatar has categorically denied the allegations, as have Hayatou and Anouma.

FIFA president Blatter said, that the British newspaper The Sunday Times has agreed to bring its whistle-blowing source to meet senior FIFA officials, who will decide whether to order a new investigation into alleged World Cup bidding corruption. "[The Sunday Times] are happy, they agreed that they will bring this whistleblower here to Zürich and then we will have a discussion, an investigation of this", Blatter said.

Specifically, the whistle-blower claims that FIFA executive committee members Issa Hayatou and Jacques Anouma were paid $1.5 million to vote for Qatar. The emirate's bid beat the United States in a final round of voting last December. Blatter did not rule out reopening the 2022 vote if corruption could be proved, but urged taking the matter "step by step". The FIFA president said his organization is "anxiously awaiting" more evidence before asking its ethics committee to examine allegations made in Britain's Parliament in early May 2011.

Hayatou, who is from Cameroon, leads the Confederation of African Football and is a FIFA vice president. Anouma is president of Ivorian Football Federation. The whistle-blower said Qatar agreed to pay a third African voter, Amos Adamu, for his support. The Nigerian was later suspended from voting after a FIFA ethics court ruled he solicited bribes from undercover Sunday Times reporters posing as lobbyists. Blatter said the newspaper and its whistle-blower would meet with FIFA secretary general, Jérôme Valcke, and legal director, Marco Villiger.

Allegations against FIFA officials have also been made to the UK Parliament by David Triesman, the former head of England's bid and the English Football Association. Triesman told the lawmakers that four long-standing FIFA executive committee members—Jack Warner, Nicolás Leoz, Ricardo Teixeira and Worawi Makudi—engaged in "improper and unethical" conduct in the 2018 bidding, which was won by Russia. All six FIFA voters have denied wrongdoing.

On 28 September 2015, Sepp Blatter suggested that the 2018 World Cup being awarded to Russia was planned before the voting, and that the 2022 World Cup would have then been awarded to the United States. However, this plan changed after the election ballot, and the 2022 World Cup was awarded to Qatar instead of the U.S.

According to leaked documents seen by The Sunday Times, Qatari state-run television channel Al Jazeera secretly offered $400  million to FIFA, for broadcasting rights, just 21 days before FIFA announced that Qatar would hold the 2022 World Cup.

On July 17, 2012, in the wake of announced anti-corruption reforms by Sepp Blatter, the president of the FIFA, the organization appointed U.S. lawyer Michael J. Garcia as the chairman of the investigative chamber of FIFA Ethics Committee, while German judge Hans-Joachim Eckert was appointed as the chairman of the Ethics Committee's adjudication chamber.

In August 2012, Garcia declared his intention to investigate the bidding process and decision to respectively award the right to host the 2018 and 2022 FIFA World Cup to Russia and Qatar by the FIFA Executive Committee. Garcia delivered his subsequent 350-page report in September 2014, and Eckert then announced that it would not be made public for legal reasons.

On November 13, 2014, Eckert released a 42-page summary of his findings after reviewing Garcia's report. The summary cleared both Russia and Qatar of any wrongdoing during the bidding for the 2018 and 2022 World Cups, leaving Russia and Qatar free to stage their respective World Cups.

FIFA welcomed "the fact that a degree of closure has been reached," while the Associated Press wrote that the Eckert summary "was denounced by critics as a whitewash." Hours after the Eckert summary was released, Garcia himself criticized it for being "materially incomplete" with "erroneous representations of the facts and conclusions," while declaring his intention to appeal to FIFA's Appeal Committee. On December 16, 2014, FIFA's Appeal Committee dismissed Garcia's appeal against the Eckert summary as "not admissible." FIFA also stated that Eckert's summary was "neither legally binding nor appealable." A day later, Garcia resigned from his role as FIFA ethics investigator in protest of FIFA's conduct, citing a "lack of leadership" and lost confidence in the independence of Eckert from FIFA. In June 2015, Swiss authorities claimed the report was of "little value".

In November 2022, the FIFA officials told players not to get involved in politics but focus on sports when they are in Qatar. A few weeks earlier, the football associations and players of Denmark and Australia criticized Qatar for this.

2011 FIFA presidential election
FIFA announced on 25 May 2011 that it had opened the investigation to examine the conduct of four officials—Mohamed Bin Hammam and Jack Warner, along with Caribbean Football Union (CFU) officials Debbie Minguell and Jason Sylvester—in relation to claims made by executive committee member, Chuck Blazer. Blazer, who was at the time, the general secretary of the CONCACAF confederation, has alleged that violations were committed under the FIFA code of ethics during a meeting organized by Bin Hammam and Warner on 10 and 11 May—the same time Lord Triesman had accused Warner of demanding money for a World Cup 2018 vote—in relation to the 2011 FIFA presidential election, in which Bin Hammam, who also played a key role in the Qatar 2022 FIFA World Cup bid, allegedly offered financial incentives for votes cast in his favour during the presidential election.

As a result of the investigation both Bin Hammam and Warner were suspended. Warner reacted to his suspension by questioning Blatter's conduct and adding that FIFA secretary general, Jérôme Valcke, had told him via e-mail that Qatar had bought the 2022 World Cup. Valcke subsequently issued a statement denying he had suggested it was bribery, saying instead that the country had "used its financial muscle to lobby for support". Qatar officials denied any impropriety. Bin Hammam also responded by writing to FIFA, protesting unfair treatment in suspension by the FIFA Ethics Committee and FIFA administration.

Further evidence emerged of alleged corruption. On 30 May 2011, Fred Lunn, vice-president of the Bahamas Football Association, said that he was given $40,000 in cash as an incitement to vote for FIFA presidential candidate, Mohamed bin Hammam. In addition, on 11 June 2011 Louis Giskus, president of the Surinamese Football Association, alleged that he was given $40,000 in cash for "development projects" as an incentive to vote for Bin Hammam.

Response to allegations
After being re-elected as president of FIFA, Sepp Blatter responded to the allegations by promising to reform FIFA in wake of the bribery scandal, with Danny Jordaan, CEO of the 2010 FIFA World Cup in South Africa, saying there is great expectation for reform. Former US Secretary of State Henry Kissinger is being tipped for a role on the newly proposed 'Solutions Committee', and former Netherlands national football team player Johan Cruyff was also being linked with a role.

UEFA secretary-general Gianni Infantino said he hopes for "concrete" measures to be taken by the world game's authority. Saying that "the UEFA executive committee has taken note of the will of FIFA to take concrete and effective measures for good governance ... [and is] following the situation closely."

IOC president Jacques Rogge commented on the situation by saying that he believes FIFA "can emerge stronger" from its worst-ever crisis, stating that "I will not point a finger and lecture ... I am sure FIFA can emerge stronger and from within".

Several of FIFA's partners and sponsors have raised concerns about the allegations of corruption, including Coca-Cola, Adidas, Emirates and Visa. Coca-Cola raised concerns by saying "the current allegations being raised are distressing and bad for the sport"; with Adidas saying "the negative tenor of the public debate around Fifa at the moment is neither good for football nor for Fifa and its partners"; moreover Emirates raised its concerns by saying "we hope that these issues will be resolved as soon as possible"; and Visa adding "the current situation is clearly not good for the game and we ask that Fifa take all necessary steps to resolve the concerns that have been raised."

Australian Sports Minister Mark Arbib said it was clear FIFA needed to change, saying "there is no doubt there needs to be reform of FIFA. This is something that we're hearing worldwide", with Australian Senator Nick Xenophon accusing FIFA of "scamming" the country out of the A$46  million (US$35 million) it spent on the Australia 2022 FIFA World Cup bid, saying that "until the investigation into FIFA has been completed, Australia must hold off spending any more taxpayers' money on any future World Cup bids."

Theo Zwanziger, president of the German Football Association, also called on FIFA to re-examine the awarding of the 2022 World Cup to Qatar.

Transparency International, which had called on FIFA to postpone the election pending a full independent investigation, renewed its call on FIFA to change its governance structure.

Moreover, former Argentine football player Diego Maradona was critical of FIFA in light of the corruption scandal, comparing members of the board to dinosaurs. He said "Fifa is a big museum. They are dinosaurs who do not want to relinquish power. It's always going to be the same." In October 2011, Dick Pound criticized the organization, saying, "FIFA has fallen far short of a credible demonstration that it recognizes the many problems it faces, that it has the will to solve them, that it is willing to be transparent about what it is doing and what it finds, and that its conduct in the future will be such that the public can be confident in the governance of the sport."

2018 revision of code of ethics
In 2018, FIFA revised its code of ethics to remove corruption as one of the enumerated bases of ethical violations. It retained bribery, misappropriation of funds and manipulation of competitions as offences, but added a statute of limitation clause that those offences could not be pursued after a ten-year period.

The revision also made it an offense to make public statements of a defamatory nature against FIFA. Alexandra Wrage, a former member of the FIFA governance committee and an expert in anti-bribery compliance, said that of the revision that "the real value to FIFA is the chilling effect this will have on critics".

See also

Association football culture
Association football tactics and skills
FIFA (video game series)
List of association football clubs
List of association football competitions
List of association football stadiums by country
List of women's national association football teams
List of top association football goal scorers
List of women's association football clubs
Lists of association football players
 FIFA Congress

Notes

References

Further reading
Paul Darby, Africa, Football and Fifa: Politics, Colonialism and Resistance (Sport in the Global Society), Frank Cass Publishers 2002, .
John Sugden, FIFA and the Contest For World Football, Polity Press 1998, .
Jim Trecker, Charles Miers, J. Brett Whitesell, ed., Women's Soccer: The Game and the Fifa World Cup, Universe 2000, Revised Edition, .

External links

  
 "FIFA's Dirty Secrets" transcript—An episode of the BBC's Panorama
 Document on alleged FIFA corruption

 
1904 establishments in France
Association football governing bodies
Organisations based in Zürich
International sports bodies based in Switzerland
International sports organizations
IOC-recognised international federations
Presidents of FIFA
Sports organizations established in 1904